Ferngrove Vineyards (often referred to simply as Ferngrove) is an Australian winery based at Frankland River, in the Great Southern wine region of Western Australia.

Founded in 1997, the winery has been controlled since 2011 by diversified Chinese manufacturing and food company Pegasus, owned by businessman Xingfa Ma.   , it had opened more than 50 dedicated Ferngrove-only wine shops across China.

Ferngrove also makes the wines marketed under the brand name "Killerby".

See also

 Australian wine
 List of wineries in Western Australia
 Western Australian wine

References

Notes

Bibliography

External links
 – official site

Food and drink companies established in 1997
Great Southern (Western Australia)
Wineries in Western Australia
1997 establishments in Australia